Zenon Czechowski (19 November 1946 – 17 November 2016) was a Polish cyclist. He competed in the individual road race and the team time trial events at the 1968 Summer Olympics.

References

External links
 

1946 births
2016 deaths
Polish male cyclists
Olympic cyclists of Poland
Cyclists at the 1968 Summer Olympics
Sportspeople from Poznań